William John Jankunis (born June 29, 1955) is an American athlete. He competed in the men's high jump at the 1976 Summer Olympics. Jankunis won the 1976 United States Summer Olympic High Jump Trials on June 28, 1976, at University of Oregon's Hayward Stadium with a jump of 2.28 metres (7 ft. 5 3⁄4 in).

As a resident of Midland Beach, Jankunis attended New Dorp High School in New Dorp, Staten Island, New York.  He was inducted into the Staten Island Sports Hall of Fame in 1996.

References

External links
 

1955 births
Living people
Athletes (track and field) at the 1976 Summer Olympics
American male high jumpers
Olympic track and field athletes of the United States
Place of birth missing (living people)
New Dorp High School alumni
Track and field athletes from New York City